This is a list of countries and territories by home ownership rate, which is the ratio of owner-occupied units to total residential units in a specified area.

See also

Owner-occupancy
Home ownership in the United States
Homeownership in Germany

Notes and references

Geography-related lists
Home ownership rate
Quality of life
home ownership rate